Jose Ejercito may refer to:

 real name of Joseph Estrada
 real name of Jinggoy Estrada